Fadi Elsalameen , sometimes written as Fadi El-Salameen, (born in Hebron on December 12, 1983) is a non-resident fellow at the Foreign Policy Institute at the Johns Hopkins School of Advanced International Studies (SAIS). Elsalameen is also the president of the Palestinian Security Project, a new think tank that has been created to develop a Palestinian national security vision and strategy. Elsalameen is also an adjunct senior fellow at the American Security Project, a Washington, DC, think tank that has been created to develop an American national security vision and strategy for the 21st century. Elsalameen was also a fellow with the New America Foundation's American Strategy Program, a nonpartisan public policy institute that invests in new thinkers and new ideas to address the next generation of challenges facing the United States. He was the director general of Palestine Note. Before that, he served as the director of institutional advancement at the American Task Force on Palestine (ATFP) where he established the Development Department by securing the first foundation grant to the organization.

Elsalameen worked as a program adviser at the Imaginenations Group where he worked with teams of international development finance and youth experts to design investment strategies for youth in the Middle East and South America.

Political life
Elsalameen became involved in the political arena at a young age. Since 1998, Elsalameen has been an active participant in the international organization Seeds of Peace, participating in and lecturing at numerous leadership summits and conferences on topics related to Middle Eastern youth, conflict resolution, and extremism. He was handpicked to take part in this organization by the late Palestinian president Yasser Arafat.

Elsalameen was personally invited by the then-president of the US, Bill Clinton, to attend the Clinton Global Initiative in 2005, and helped secure a commitment for a political risk insurance initiative to encourage investment in Gaza after the Israeli withdrawal at the time. As of 2020 and 2021, Elsalameen has become increasingly notable as a vocal critic of the current Palestinian government.  
Elsalameen is also part of a new non-partisan Palestinian youth movement that calls for nonviolent reform in the Palestinian territories.

Fund for Palestinian students 

Elsalameen, through the Fadi Elsalameen fund for students in need, (Arabic: صندوق فادي السلامين للطالب المحتاج), funds around 30 Palestinian students annually to go to Hebron University (Arabic:جامعة الخليل) and Al-Quds University (Arabic:جامعة القدس) where they focus on fields of studies such as economics, engineering, and medicine.

Personal life
Elsalameen is the eldest of nine children. Elsalameen lives between Hebron in the Palestinian territories with his extended family and Washington, DC. His grandfather, Hussein Nassar Elsalameen, was the vice mayor of Assamoua (Arabic: السموع), a small town in southern Hebron and was one of the founders of the current municipality. He was also the Mukhtar (Arabic: المختار) of the Elsalameen tribe in Palestine. 

Elsalameen received a full scholarship to The Gunnery private boarding school in Washington, Connecticut. Later he graduated from Earlham College with a B.S. in biochemistry and political science and then received a Masters in International Relations and Economics with a specialization in China Studies from Johns Hopkins University (SAIS). Elsalameen speaks Arabic, Hebrew, English, French, and Mandarin-Chinese.

References 

1983 births
Living people
People from Hebron
Palestinian writers
Palestinian bloggers
People of the Arab Spring